Bailout at 43,000 is a 1957 American drama film directed by Francis D. Lyon and written by Paul Monash. The film stars John Payne, Karen Steele, Paul Kelly, Richard Eyer, Constance Ford and Eddie Firestone. The film was released on May 1, 1957, by United Artists.

It was the last film from Pine-Thomas Productions then known as Pine-Thomas-Shane.

Plot
United States Air Force Colonel William Hughes (Paul Kelly) asks Major Paul Peterson (John Payne), who has been called back to active service, to join a team at the Air Research and Development Command conducting tests on a downward ejection seat for bombardiers in the new Boeing B-47 Stratojet bomber. The first tests used articulated dummies, but human test subjects are needed. Besides Colonel Hughes, German scientist Dr. Franz Gruener (Gregory Gaye), also is in charge of the test program, working directly with the test subjects. Captain Jack Nolan (Richard Crane) is also assigned to the project.

The first volunteer, Captain Mike Cavallero (Eddie Firestone), suffers a broken neck when his parachute opens too early. He survives the test but is hospitalized. The next subject is Lieutenant Edward Simmons, to be followed by Paul. When Mike is suddenly rushed to hospital with an appendicitis attack, Paul moves up. Worried because he has a wife and son, Paul is reluctant to go, but then finds out that Captain Nolan has  been killed in a B-47 crash, and as the bombardier, he might not have been able to escape the aircraft.

His wife (Karen Steele) begs his commanding officer to release Paul from his commitment. When Paul shows up to take the test, he finds Colonel Hughes suiting up. Imploring him to reconsider, Paul makes the case for doing the test to prove that a bailout is possible from the high-speed jet bomber. Flying with Dr. Gruener, Paul ejects, but when the ground observers ask him to indicate he is well by spread-eagling, he does not respond.  On board the rescue launch, they pick up Paul and find he is fine; he was simply concentrating so hard that he forgot to spread-eagle. After he is cleared by the medics, Paul is greeted by Carol and his son Kit (Richard Eyer) and, with their blessing, decides to continue with the project.

Cast

 John Payne as Major Paul Peterson
 Karen Steele as Carol Peterson
 Paul Kelly as Colonel Hughes
 Richard Eyer as Kit Peterson
 Constance Ford as Mrs. Frances Nolan
 Eddie Firestone as Captain Mike Cavallero
 Adam Kennedy as Lieutenant Ed Simmons
 Gregory Gaye as Dr. Franz Gruener
 Steven Ritch as Major Irv Goldman
 Richard Crane as Captain Jack Nolan

Original TV Play
Bailout at 43,000 Feet was an episode of the Climax! dramatic anthology television series. The episode played on season 2 as episode 15, airing on December 29, 1955, directed by John Frankenheimer, produced by Martin Manulis, hosted by William Lundigan and starring Richard Boone and Bart Burns.

Cast
Charlton Heston as Lt. Paul Peterson
Nancy Reagan as Carol Peterson
Richard Boone ss Col. Hughes
Lee Marvin as Capt. Cavallero
Bart Burns
Charles Davis
Gil Frye
John Gallaudet
Harvey Grant
William Hughes

Production
Carl Dudley originally expressed interest in buying the screen rights to the TV play. Eventually Bill Thomas of Pine-Thomas-Shane Productions got them.

In adapting the episode for the screen, Bailout at 43,000 was slightly revised, with tension heightened in the interaction between a former Nazi scientist and pilots engaged in the bailout tests.

In August 1956 it was announced Boone would reprise his TV role. However in October he was replaced by Paul Kelly.

Star John Payne was winding up his film career with Bailout at 43,000, while Paul Kelly made his last film appearance, ending a long career that began in 1911 as a child actor in silent films. Karen Steele was borrowed from Sam Goldwyn Jr.

The film was made with the full cooperation of the United States Air Force and featured a number of airfield and aerial sequences with Boeing B-47 Stratojet bombers.

Filming started 1 October 1956.

Reception
Bailout at 43,000 was burdened by both its television episode origin and a B-movie budget, making it little more than what film critic Leonard Maltin called,  "Routine material" "... not enhanced by flight sequences or romantic relief."

The New York Times called it a "tedious film".

It was the last film from Pine-Thomas Productions.

References

Notes

Citations

Bibliography

 Pendo, Stephen. Aviation in the Cinema. Lanham, Maryland: Scarecrow Press, 1985. .

External links
 
 
Original 1955 TV play at IMDb
Review at Variety

1957 films
1957 drama films
American aviation films
American drama films
American black-and-white films
Films directed by Francis D. Lyon
Films scored by Albert Glasser
United Artists films
Skydiving in fiction
Films based on television plays
1950s English-language films
1950s American films